The 2015 Australian Goldfields Open was a professional ranking snooker tournament that took place between 29 June and 5 July 2015 at the Bendigo Stadium in Bendigo, Australia. It was the first ranking event of the 2015/2016 season.

Judd Trump was the defending champion, but he lost 1–5 against Stephen Maguire in the quarter-finals.

John Higgins defeated Martin Gould 9–8 in the final to win the 27th ranking title of his career.

Prize fund
The breakdown of prize money for this year is shown below:

Winner: $75,000
Runner-up: $32,000
Semi-final: $20,000
Quarter-final: $17,000
Last 16: $12,000
Last 32: $9,000
Last 48: $2,000
Last 64: $1000
Last 96: $500

Non-televised highest break: $100
Televised highest break: $2,500
Total: $521,600

Wildcard round

Main draw

Final

Qualifying stages

The qualifying stages for this event took place at K2 in Crawley, England between 1–5 June 2015.

Century breaks

Qualifying stage centuries

 133  Michael Wasley
 132, 127  Zhang Anda
 132  Allan Taylor
 130  Andrew Higginson
 130  David Morris
 127  David Grace
 122  Ian Glover
 118, 104, 101  Chris Wakelin
 115, 100  Kyren Wilson
 113  Zhao Xintong
 110, 100  Barry Pinches
 109  James Cahill
 108  Ken Doherty
 107, 102  Rory McLeod

 106  Chen Zhe
 106  Peter Ebdon
 105  Andrew Higginson
 105  Peter Lines
 104  Daniel Wells
 104  Mike Dunn
 102  David Gilbert
 101  Michael Leslie
 101  Ian Burns
 100  Rhys Clark
 100  Jamie Cope
 100  Hammad Miah
 100  Jamie Burnett

Televised stage centuries

 142  Ricky Walden
 141  Mark Selby
 138, 122, 109, 101, 100  Martin Gould
 137  Joe Perry
 136  Robert Milkins
 134, 133, 112  John Higgins
 132  Jamie Jones
 128  Fergal O'Brien
 114, 111, 102  Judd Trump
 114  Ali Carter
 106  Mark Joyce

References

2015
Australian Goldfields Open
Goldfields Open
Sport in Bendigo